Yojangandha is a Nepali novel by Binod Prasad Dhital. It was published in 1995 by Sajha Prakashan. The book is based on a character from Mahabharata, Satyawati. The book won the prestigious Madan Puraskar. It is second book of the author who previously penned a regional novel called Ujyalo Hunu Aghi.

Synopsis 
The book depicts the story of Satyawati as she emerges from being a daughter of a fisherman to the queen of Hastinapur. The plot of Yojangandha is mainly based on Mahabharata and partly on Harivansh Purana and Devi Bhagavata. Yojangandha is also one of the innumerable characters hidden within the vastness of the gigantic book Mahabharata. The Hindu mythological female character Yojanagandha also has a significant place in the Mahabharata, while the novelist Dhital has portrayed Yojanagandha as the main character in the this novel.

Characters 

 Satyawati, an adopted daughter of a fisherman.
 King Shantanu, king of Hastinapur
 Bhisma, son of Shantanu and goddess Ganga
 Vyasa, son of Satyawati with Parashara
 Parashara, a sage 

 Chitrangada, son of Satyawati and Shantanu
 Vichitravirya, son of Satyawati and Shantanu

Reception 
The book received the Madan Puraskar 2052 BS (1995 CE), the highest literary honor in Nepali literature. The book also won the Sajha Puraskar in the same year.

See also 

 Madhabi
 Yogmaya
 Nepali Shakuntala

References 

Nepalese novels
20th-century Nepalese novels
1995 novels
Madan Puraskar-winning works
Sajha Puraskar-winning works
1995 Nepalese novels
Novels based on the Mahabharata
Nepali-language novels
Nepalese mythological novels